The following units and commanders of the U.S. and Spanish armies fought at the Battle of El Caney during the Spanish–American War on July 1, 1898.

Abbreviations used

Military Rank
 MG = Major General
 BG = Brigadier General
 Col = Colonel
 Ltc = Lieutenant Colonel
 Maj = Major
 Cpt = Captain
 Lt = 1st Lieutenant

Other
 w = wounded
 k = killed
 m = missing

U.S.

Fifth Army Corps
MG William R. Shafter, not present

Spanish

IV Corps
Gen Arsenio Linares, not present

See also
 San Juan Hill order of battle

References

Spanish-American War orders of battle